The Valdostan regional election of 2008 took place in Italy's Aosta Valley on 25 May 2008. The election saw the victory of the centrist autonomist coalition led by Aosta Valley's former governor, Augusto Rollandin.

Results

References

2008 elections in Italy
Elections in Aosta Valley
May 2008 events in Europe